Wafic Rida Saïd (born 21 December 1939) is a Syrian-Saudi-Canadian financier, businessman, and philanthropist, who has resided for many years in Monaco.

Saïd lived in Syria until his early twenties before he left Syria for Switzerland where he worked as a banker, before making his fortune in the Saudi Arabian construction industry in the 1970s. Saïd came to public prominence after helping facilitate the Al-Yamamah arms deal between the United Kingdom and Saudi Arabia in the 1980s. He established the Saïd Foundation in 1982 and the Saïd Business School at the University of Oxford in 1996 with an initial £20 million donation to the University. Saïd owns several properties worldwide, including Tusmore Park in Oxfordshire, but is officially a resident of Monaco.

Saïd is a Foundation Fellow of Somerville College, Oxford.

Biography
Saïd was born in Damascus, Syria, in 1939 to a prominent Syrian family. Saïd's grandfather had served in the Turkish army during the Ottoman period, reaching the rank of general and was a colonial governor of Ottoman Syria. Saïd was the youngest son of Rida Saïd, a prominent Syrian ophthalmologist who was the Syrian Minister for Higher Education and who had founded the Syrian University in Damascus in 1926 under the request of the then King Faisal.

Saïd's father died when he was still a child, and after initial schooling by Jesuits in Beirut, Lebanon, Saïd studied at the Institute of Bankers in London. Saïd had been offered a place at the University of Cambridge, but was unable to take up the place as a result of political instability in Syria in which his family's assets were sequestrated.

Saïd finally left Syria amidst the 1963 Syrian coup d'état. Saïd described the atmosphere in Syria at the time as being similar to 'the Terror in the French Revolution' in which 'young men were being rounded up.' In Switzerland Saïd worked for the Union de Banque Suisse (now UBS), and later the Banque Commerciale Arabe SA, before his return to England. Saïd established two restaurants serving Middle Eastern cuisine in London in 1967, including Caravanserai on Kensington High Street, the restaurants were sold in 1969.

In 1969, Saïd married Rosemary Thompson, whom he had met in Switzerland, and they had three children together; two sons, Karim and Khaled, and a daughter, Rasha. In 1981, their son Karim died in an accident at the home of Prince Sultan in Saudi Arabia. Saïd was attending a ceremony at the prince's house at the time to receive Saudi citizenship by royal decree. To honour his son Saïd established the Karim Rida Saïd Foundation to help disadvantaged children and young people of the Middle East.

Saïd moved to Saudi Arabia in 1969. Saudi Arabia lacked much modern infrastructure at the time, and large infrastructure projects were subsequently funded by the rising price of oil in the early 1970s. During this period of time, he founded and invested in companies that supported large-scale infrastructural projects.

Saïd was ambassador and head of the delegation of St Vincent and the Grenadines to UNESCO from 1996 to 2018. Saïd also previously served as St Vincent and the Grenadines ambassador to the Holy See.

In March 2016, Saïd was told by British banking firm Barclays that he could no longer bank with them, despite having been a long-standing customer; the BBC reported that "The bank is understood to be concerned about holding accounts that are linked to what are described as 'high-risk countries'". In response, Saïd said he would be taking legal action against Barclays. Those proceedings were settled by June 2016.

Relationship with Syria
Saïd assisted the future Syrian president Bashar al-Assad with securing a place in Britain to study ophthalmology in 1992, and was acquainted with the Anglo-Syrian family of Assad's wife, Asma al-Assad (née Akhras). In a 2012 interview with Charles Moore in The Spectator, Saïd said that he had found Bashar '...civilised, nice, polished', and that he admired Asma as 'a caring person'. Saïd welcomed Bashar's ascension to the Presidency of Syria following the death of his father, Hafez al-Assad, feeling it was Syria's 'only salvation. His acceptance speech in 2000 was music to my ears. He said he wanted to reform the legal system, revoke the [now 50-year-old] emergency laws, and fight corruption.' Saïd helped introduce Western politicians and businesspeople to Syria, and helped push for political reform in the country. Visiting Syria in 2011 at the advent of the Syrian uprisings in response to the Arab Spring, Saïd told Asma that 'the winds of change are contagious. Please tell the President to promise free elections. He must be the champion of change.'

Saïd was appalled by the resulting Syrian Civil War and was summoned to see Bashar al-Assad in June 2011 as he wished to gauge Western views of the conflict. Saïd implored Assad to enact promised reforms and to engage with his political opponents. Saïd welcomed the Arab Spring and wished for a secular government in Egypt modelled on that of Turkey's.

Saïd Foundation
The Karim Rida Saïd Foundation was established in 1982 by Wafic and Rosemary Saïd in memory of their son. It was renamed the Saïd Foundation in 2008. It is an English charity. 
  
Since 1984, the Scholarships Programme has offered scholarships and training opportunities for talented young Syrians, Jordanians, Lebanese and Palestinians, mainly to study in the UK, to enable them to acquire skills that will bring benefits to others in their countries of origin. To date the Foundation has funded scholarships for almost 900 students from these countries.

In 1993 the Foundation established the Child Development Programme (CDP) with the aim of supporting Jordanian, Lebanese and Palestinian community-based organisations to develop and deliver good quality and sustainable care services for disabled children and education in areas of greatest need. The CDP has funded more than 250 project grants since its start, reaching tens of thousands of children.

In 1996, the Foundation established the first Disability Programme in Syria, opening an office in 2001 to directly implement the Programme. The office became a locally registered charity in Syria in 2012, the Saïd Foundation for Development. The programme worked to strengthen the professional capacity of disability practitioners and organisations, raising awareness of disability, developing a cadre of national trainers in disability-related fields and supporting or providing services for children with disabilities (and their families) especially in marginalised communities.

Due to the current turmoil in Syria, since late 2011 the Saïd Foundation has been providing support for non-political organisations that are delivering emergency humanitarian assistance, including shelters, medical care and schooling, to Syrians most affected by the crisis, whether refugees in Lebanon and Jordan or internally displaced within Syria itself. It has pledged over US$1.8 million to the UN Refugee Agency (UNHCR) for university scholarships for Syrian refugees in Jordan and Lebanon.

The Saïd Foundation also supports the Saïd Business School at the University of Oxford.

Business career
In the 1960s, Saïd became acquainted with the Saudi Arabian princes Bandar and Khalid, sons of Prince Sultan, who was the brother of King Fahd and would later become the Saudi defence minister. Princes Bandar and Khalid would later serve as the Saudi Arabian ambassador to the United States and co-commander of Allied forces in the Gulf War, respectively.

Following his acquaintance with Akram Ojjeh, a fellow Syrian financier and the founder of the TAG Group, Saïd established TAG Systems Constructions SA, a civil engineering and telecommunications business, which he chaired.

In 1992, Saïd won a unanimous verdict in a libel case in the British high court, and was awarded £400,000 in damages. The case concerned letters that had been published alleging that Saïd was untrustworthy. Saïd described the letters as "humiliating and untrue", and that the allegations in the letters had caused him "tremendous damage".

Saïd owned almost 50% of British Mediterranean Airways, and loaned the airline £8 million before its 2007 sale to BMI.

Saïd's wealth was estimated at £1.5 billion by the Sunday Times Rich List in 2014. In 1995 Saïd co-founded Sagitta Asset Management, which handled his family's wealth and the assets of other ultra high-net-worth individuals and their families, it was sold to Fleming Family & Partners in 2005. Saïd also invested in the merchant bank established by Jonathan Aitken, Aitken Hume, and invested £5 million in the short lived Sunday Correspondent newspaper. In the United States Saïd invested in the National Bank of Washington and Garfinckel's stores.

Al-Yamamah contract

Saïd helped facilitate the al-Yamamah deal between the British and Saudi governments in the 1980s. The al-Yamamah deal is the biggest export deal in British history and has generated £43 billion in revenue for the British company BAE Systems. The Daily Telegraph has described Saïd as a 'key fixer' who 'helped broker' the deal, with the Guardian describing Said as the 'fixer at the heart' of the deal.

The Guardian newspaper wrote that from the proceeds of al-Yamamah '[British] Police later calculated that more than £6bn may have been distributed in corrupt commissions, via an array of agents and middlemen'. In June 2007, the BBC's Panorama alleged BAE Systems had paid Prince Bandar "hundreds of millions of pounds" in return for his role in the al-Yamamah deals. Turki bin Nasser was also a recipient of money from BAE.

An investigation into the al-Yamamah deal was opened by the British Serious Fraud Office (SFO) and later closed for reasons of national security after the Saudi Arabian government had threatened to withhold cooperation on anti-terrorist issues.

In a 2007 statement issued by Saïd on the al-Yamamah deal said that he had "...never been the 'business manager' for anybody, let alone any member of the Saudi Royal Family, nor has he ever 'distributed commissions' to any member of the Saudi Royal Family". Saïd's role in al-Yamamah has led to him being described as an arms dealer, a term that he rejects. In 2001 Saïd said that the deal '... brought a huge boost to British industry: you are talking about thousands of jobs. But for some reason, which I cannot understand, the press want to portray this as a shady, mysterious deal ... Quite honestly, I thought I was doing this country a favour; I have never even sold a penknife. I was not paid a penny [for advising British Aerospace] but I benefited because the project led to construction in Saudi Arabia that involved my companies.'

Saïd's friendship with Thatcher's son, Mark Thatcher, has been perceived as having played an important role in Britain securing the al-Yamahah deal. Mark Thatcher and Saïd have both denied allegations of commissions from the Saudi government. Companies linked to Saïd acquired properties in Belgravia and Mayfair that were 'put at the service' of Thatcher and Dick Evans, the BAE chief executive after the al-Yamamah deal according to The Guardian.

Jonathan Aitken in his 2013 book, Margaret Thatcher: Power and Personality dismisses the belief that Mark Thatcher was pivotal to the deal. Aitken emphasises the role of Margaret's husband, Denis Thatcher as the intermediary between her and Prince Bandar with the assistance of Dick Evans. Aitken described a dinner party at his house in honour of Richard Nixon at which Saïd met the Defence Secretary Michael Heseltine who told him of his optimism that Britain would secure a large defence contract for BAE Hawk aircraft with Saudi Arabia. Saïd told Heseltine of his scepticism of the deal's success, and he was later approached by James Blyth, the Ministry of Defence's head of defence sales. Blyth asked Saïd about the progress of the deal and Prince Bandar reported from his father, Prince Sultan that he had signed a letter of intent with the French government instead of the British. Saïd informed Thatcher who impressed upon him the historic ties between Britain and Saudi Arabia, which appealed to the Pro-British Prince Bandar and Saïd.

Saïd Business School

In July 1996. it was announced that Saïd had donated £20 million to the University of Oxford to found a business school. Saïd had agreed to donate the money after the university had voted in 1990 for the creation of a business school, and needed funds of £40 million. Opposition initially arose to the school due to the lack of a suitable site and the nature of management as an academic discipline, and Saïd said that he would reconsider his gift after a potential site on a sports ground at Mansfield Road in Oxford was voted against. The new building for the school opened in August 2001, designed by Edward Jones and Jeremy Dixon. It was accompanied by protests over Saïd's role in the Al-Yamamah arms deal. A new building at the school, the Thatcher Business Education Centre was opened by The Prince of Wales in 2013 and named by Prime Minister David Cameron in 2014 in the presence of Saïd and his wife, Rosemary. Nelson Mandela visited the Saïd Business School at the invitation of Saïd in 2002, to open the lecture theatre named in his honour.

Saïd had donated over £70 million to the school by 2014, and he is a member of the University of Oxford's Chancellor's Court of Benefactors. The court consists of the largest individual donors to Oxford, and meets annually with senior officials from the university. Saïd's philanthropic efforts for the university have seen him honoured with the Sheldon Medal, the highest honour that Oxford bestows upon its benefactors. The Sheldon Medal is awarded annually to a member of the Chancellor’s Court of Benefactors that has 'made a strategic difference to the life of the university'. A bust of Saïd by Michael Rizzello stands at the entrance to the Saïd Business School, it was one of the last works sculpted by Rizzello before his death in 2004.

Relationship with Margaret Thatcher
Saïd was a passionate supporter of the British Conservative Prime Minister Margaret Thatcher, and said of the effect of her premiership after the Winter of Discontent that 'We found we couldn't rely on British manufacturers any more. Then here she comes, this lioness. The honour of England is challenged in the Falklands and she sends an armada! She fights the most powerful union and defeats it.' and said that 'for me, her friendship is the biggest medal'.

Saïd was a significant donor to Thatcher's Conservatives in the 1980s, donating at least £350,000 during her premiership. Saïd can no longer donate to British political parties due to his foreign citizenship. Saïd's wife, Rosemary, donated £580,000 to the Conservatives between 2012 and 2014, and Saïd's daughter, Rasha, was recorded as having given four donations totalling £47,000 to the Conservatives in 2008, but these were later explained as having come from her mother, after being incorrectly reported by the Conservatives to the Electoral Commission. The Sunday Times had reported that she had asked her parents to donate to the party on her behalf, and that some of the money had come from them, but her father said that she was mistaken as she could not afford to make such a donation.

Saïd is close friends with Charles Powell, the former chief foreign affairs adviser to Thatcher. Saïd appointed Powell chairman of his Sagitta Asset Management in 2001, and Powell chairs the Saïd Business School Foundation.

Other interests
Saïd was an executive producer of the 1987 film The Fourth Protocol, based on Frederick Forsyth's novel of the same name. Saïd funded half the film's budget of £3.5 million due to his love of Forsyth's novel.

Other donations
Saïd has significantly donated to St Mary's Hospital in Paddington, London, The Prince of Wales's Charitable Foundation, Eton College, and the Royal Shakespeare Company. He also donated £250,000 to the victims of the 7 July 2005 London bombings. He is the founding donor of the Wafic Saïd Molecular Cardiology Research Laboratories at the Texas Heart Institute.

Art collecting
Saïd is a noted collector of Impressionist art, having owned paintings by Jean Renoir, Claude Monet, Paul Cézanne, and paintings of sporting scenes. Saïd put 11 paintings from his collection up for auction at Phillips in New York in 2000, among the paintings that sold were Renoir's Women in the Garden (1873) and Girl in a Flowered Hat (1896), Pissarro's September Festival, Pontoise (1872) and Cézanne's Hill of Galet, Pontoise (1879–80).

In 1982 Saïd paid a record £80,000 at auction for a Quran that had been made for Qaitbay, the 15th-century Egyptian sultan in 1488. The Quran was for a period displayed at the newly constructed Regent's Park Mosque in London.

In 1987 Saïd acquired 20 pieces from the auction of the jewellery collection of Wallis Simpson, including the famous panther bracelet, the cross bracelet and the flamingo brooch by Cartier. All these were later sold at an auction in 2010.

Horse racing
Saïd was a prominent racehorse owner, having owned the Henry Cecil trained horses Bosra Sham and Lady Carla. Lady Carla was named for Carla Powell, the socialite wife of Charles Powell. Bosra Sham won the 1996 1,000 Guineas and Champion Stakes under Said's racing colours. Saïd's Sagitta Asset Management sponsored the 1,000 and 2,000 Guinea Stakes, and having ended their sponsorship in 2003, Saïd withdrew his racing interests, citing his non-residence in England as the reason.

Property

Saïd family trusts own two homes in the United Kingdom, a £10 million property in Eaton Square in London's Belgravia district, which when bought in 1992, was then the highest price paid for an apartment in the United Kingdom, and Tusmore Park, a 3,000 acre estate near Bicester in Oxfordshire. Tusmore Park is near Prince Bandar's 2,000 acre Glympton Park estate. In 2012 Saïd erected a 92 ft limestone obelisk topped with gold in the grounds of Tusmore Park to honour the Diamond Jubilee of Elizabeth II. The obelisk is the largest constructed in the United Kingdom since the 18th century. Margaret Thatcher frequently visited Saïd at Tusmore Park, staying for long periods in Tusmore Park's Clock House in the last years of her life. Saïd rebuilt Tusmore House in 2000 to a neo-Georgian design by William Whitfield of Whitfield Lockwood Architects. In 2004 the Georgian Group gave the completed house its award for the "best new building in the Classical tradition".

Saïd also owns homes in Marbella in Spain, France, Saudi Arabia, and Syria. Saïd is officially resident in the tax haven of Monaco.

Awards
Sheldon Medal, University of Oxford; Grand Commandeur Ordre de Mérite du Cèdre of Lebanon and Ordre de Mérite of Morocco.

References

External links

Saïd Investment Holdings
Saïd Business School

1939 births
Living people
People from Damascus
People from Monte Carlo
Saïd Business School
Saudi Arabian art collectors
Saudi Arabian billionaires
Saudi Arabian businesspeople
Saudi Arabian expatriates in Monaco
Saudi Arabian expatriates in the United Kingdom
Saudi Arabian Muslims
Saudi Arabian philanthropists
Saudi Arabian racehorse owners and breeders
Syrian businesspeople
Syrian expatriates in Monaco
Syrian expatriates in England
Syrian Muslims
UBS people
Syrian emigrants to Saudi Arabia
Saudi Arabian people of Syrian descent
Fellows of Somerville College, Oxford
Conservative Party (UK) donors
Syrian billionaires